Mary Ann Aldersey (24 June 1797 – 1868) was the first Christian missionary woman (married or single) to serve in China proper (excluding Macau & Hong Kong, where Henrietta Shuck had been working earlier). She founded a school for girls in Ningbo, Zhejiang. Her pioneering the field of mission work for single women in China was the most remarkable outcome of her life.

Biography

Early life

Mary Ann Aldersey was born on June 27, 1797, in the Hackney London, England. Aldersey was a native of London from a wealthy nonconformist family. Aldersey’s father, Joseph, was considered a social leader amongst the small episcopal congregation of Dr. John Pye Smith. Aldersey joined the congregation as a member at the age of twenty-one and worked as the financial secretary of the Ladies’ Bible Association. When Aldersey’s mother, Elizabeth, died in 1822, Aldersey was required to fulfill twice her usual domestic duties. 

In 1824, Robert Morrison moved to East London and taught English women interested in missionary work (usually as partners to their husbands). to speak and read Chinese

She studied Chinese under Robert Morrison in London when he was on home leave from 1824 to 1826. Also in attendance were Samuel Dyer and his wife Maria Tarn. The friendship that she forged with Maria eventually led to her inviting their orphaned teenage daughters to work with her in China. In London, Aldersey was still attached to family ties, but she made gifts to the London Missionary Society that enabled Maria Newell to go to Malacca (1827), where Newell met and married pioneer missionary Karl Gützlaff.

In 1837, she herself was able to go to Surabaya, where she started a school for Chinese girls. When the treaty ports in China were opened (1843) she moved to Ningbo where she opened a school for girls assisted by three teenagers, Mary Ann Leisk, Ruth Ati and Christiana A-Kit. Ruth Ati and Christiana were from Surabaya. Never an agent of any missionary society, Aldersey did maintain close links with the London Missionary Society. In 1848 William Armstrong Russell and Robert Henry Cobbold arrived from England. Several of her teaching staff were Chinese-speaking daughters of missionaries; at least four became missionary wives, including Burella Hunter Dyer, who married John Shaw Burdon, and Maria Jane Dyer, who married James Hudson Taylor in 1857 (against Aldersey's wishes). Another protegee, Mary Ann Leisk, became the wife of William Armstrong Russell, later bishop in north China.

In 1861, Aldersey handed her school over to the Church Missionary Society and retired to Australia, where she lived until her death. She retired to McLaren Vale, South Australia in 1861 and built a house (Tsong Gyiaou) named after a former preaching station. The name is an anglicised form of 'San Ch'iao' (pronounced 'Song Jow'). It is now part of the Southern Districts War Memorial Hospital.

References

Bibliography
E. Aldersey White (1932) A Woman Pioneer in China. The life of Mary Ann Aldersey, London, Livingstone Press
History of the Society for Promoting Female Education in the East, Edward Suter, London 1847
Missions to the Women of China, E J Whately, James Nisbet & Co, London, 1866
Joyce Reason, The Witch of Ningpo (Eagle Books, No. 30.) London: Edinburgh House Press, 1940
The Story of the China Inland Mission Volume I; Mary Geraldine Guinness, Morgan & Scott, 1894
Hudson Taylor & The China Inland Mission Volume One: In Early Years; The Growth of a Soul; Dr. & Mrs. Howard Taylor, China Inland Mission, London, 1911
Hudson Taylor's Spiritual Secret; Dr. & Mrs. Howard Taylor, China Inland Mission, London, 1932 (republished in 2007)
Hudson & Maria; Pioneers In China; John Pollock, 1964
Hudson Taylor & China's Open Century Volume One: Barbarians at the Gates; Alfred James Broomhall; Hodder and Stoughton and Overseas Missionary Fellowship, 1982
Hudson Taylor & China's Open Century Volume Two: Over the Treaty Wall; Alfred James Broomhall; Hodder and Stoughton and Overseas Missionary Fellowship, 1982
Hudson Taylor & China's Open Century Volume Three: If I Had a Thousand Lives; Alfred James Broomhall; Hodder and Stoughton and Overseas Missionary Fellowship, 1982
From Jerusalem to Iriyan Jaya; Dr. Ruth Tucker, Zondervan
Hudson Taylor: A Man In Christ; Roger Steer, Paternoster, 1990
It Is Not Death to Die; Jim Cromarty, Christian Focus, 2001
Christ Alone - A Pictorial Presentation of Hudson Taylor's Life and Legacy; OMF International, 2005
Griffiths, Valerie, Not Less Than Everything, Monarch Books & OMF International, 	Oxford, 2004

External links
OMF International (formerly China Inland Mission and Overseas Missionary Fellowship)
The First Girls' School in China
Mary's Mission
Mary the Matchmaker

1797 births
1868 deaths
English Protestant missionaries
Protestant missionaries in China
British expatriates in China
Female Christian missionaries
People from London